Gustave Hansotte (1827-1886) was a 19th-century Belgian architect, representative of neoclassical architecture and eclectic architecture of Belgium.

Constructions and buildings

Buildings of neoclassical style
 1847 : Saints-Jean-et-Nicolas Church, Brabant à Saint-Josse-ten-Noode street, architectes J.P.J. Peeters and Gustave Hansotte
 1873 : Antoine Depage Clinic, Henri Jaspar avenue 101 in Saint-Gilles
 1884 : ancient Provincial Government of the Brabant, rue du chêne 18–22 in Brussels
left wing and three levels of the central wing: G.HANSOTTE 1884
right wing and advanced standing of the central wing: G.HANO 1907

Buildings of eclectic style
 1849-1953: Saint Mary's Royal Church, square of the Queen in Schaerbeek
 neoroman style (Roman - Byzantine)
 built by Louis van Overstraeten in 1845
 accomplished by Gustave Hansotte from 1849 till 1853

 Halles de Schaerbeek
 burnt down in 1898 and rebuilt in 1901 according to the initial model by the constructor Bertaux
 1875 : former school n°1 of Etterbeek, street Fétis 29-31 
 eclecticism with neoclassical tendency
 1882 : Oratory of the Sisters of Good Help Home, Musin street 1, Saint-Josse-ten-Noode
 neoGothic

Buildings of indeterminate style
 1863: Master's hotel, Royal street 284
 demolished and replaced by the "Rotterdamsche Verzekering Societeiten" bureau (modernist style, 1936)

References

1827 births
1886 deaths
19th-century Belgian architects